Planespotting Live is a live television programme broadcast on BBC Four over three nights between 23 and 25 July 2019. Announced on 5 July 2019, it follows on from similar "live" programmes on the BBC such as Trainspotting Live, Airport Live and Volcano Live

Programme
The show is presented by Peter Snow, Zoe Laughlin and Andi Peters. Planespotting Live also featured pre-recorded reports and interviews as well as the real-time broadcast. Live cameras showed airport activity. Peter Snow led the nation on a mass plane-spot asking for users to send in pictures.

Episode List

See also
Airport Live
Trainspotting Live
The Tube
 The Railway: Keeping Britain On Track

Notes

References

External links
 

2019 British television series debuts
2019 British television series endings
Aviation history of the United Kingdom
BBC television documentaries
Documentary television series about aviation
English-language television shows